The 2013 Dakar Rally was the 35th running of the event and the fifth successive year that the event was held in South America. The event started in Lima, Peru on 5 January and finished in Santiago, Chile on 19 January after fourteen stages of competition. 448 vehicles in four classes of competition started the event, which comprised a total distance of over 8,500 kilometres. The motorcycle category was won by French rider Cyril Despres for a fifth time, riding a KTM; Marcos Patronelli took his second win in the quad competition riding a Yamaha; Stéphane Peterhansel captured his eleventh Dakar victory in the car  category alongside co-driver Jean-Paul Cottret at the wheel of a Mini; and Eduard Nikolaev's maiden victory re-captured the truck category title for Kamaz.

Entries
The official entry list for the rally was published in November 2012.

Bikes

The entry list for the bike category would be headed by reigning champion Cyril Despres, who would spearhead the challenge of Austrian manufacturer KTM on board one of the Red Bull backed factory bikes. Absent however would be the Frenchman's long-time rival Marc Coma, who was forced to withdraw from the event due to a shoulder injury sustained whilst participating in Rally Morocco. The Spaniard was replaced by US rider Kurt Caselli, who would represent KTM's AMV team alongside Joan Pedrero. KTM would also be represented by Red Bull rider Ruben Faria, Francisco López and Pål Anders Ullevålseter among numerous others.

Yamaha would field factory bikes for 2007 runner-up David Casteu, Olivier Pain, David Frétigné and Frans Verhoeven. Honda would make their return to the event after a lengthy absence, with Portuguese rider Hélder Rodrigues leading the team's assault. Husqvarna meanwhile could count Spaniards Joan Barreda and Jordi Viladoms as well as Portugal's Paulo Gonçalves among their works riders.

Quads

With defending champion Alejandro Patronelli opting not to return to defend his crown, his brother and 2010 winner Marcos Patronelli would be tasked with leading the Yamaha assault on the quad category. Fellow South American riders Tomas Maffei, Ignacio Casale and Sergio Lafuente would also be making use of Yamaha machinery.

Polish duo Łukasz Łaskawiec and Rafał Sonik, also riding for Yamaha, would also be expected to be in contention having both finished in the top three in previous years, with Dakar rookie Sebastian Husseini leading Honda's challenge for honours in the category.

Cars

Ten-time Dakar winner Stéphane Peterhansel would return to defend his 2012 crown at the wheel of a Monster Energy-sponsored Mini All4 machine prepared by X-Raid. The German team would also enter similar machines for former motorcycle category winner Nani Roma, Leonid Novitskiy and Krzysztof Hołowczyc with Orlando Terranova driving an X-Raid prepared BMW X3.

Two former winners in the shape of Carlos Sainz (2010) and Nasser Al-Attiyah (2011) would drive a pair of Damen Jefferies-built buggies in an all-new team backed by Red Bull and the Qatari government. SMG would also return with their brace of buggies, with driving duties entrusted to Guerlain Chicherit, Ronan Chabot and Bernard Errandonea.

South African Toyota dealership Imperial Toyota would field a pair of Hilux machines for 2009 winner Giniel de Villiers and Duncan Vos, with the Japanese marque also represented by Overdrive's Lucio Alvarez and Peter van Merksteijn. The challenge of Chinese manufacturer Great Wall would be led by Carlos Sousa, whilst Robby Gordon as ever would be present in his self-run Hummer H3.

Trucks

After ending several years of Kamaz domination in the 2012 event, the Petronas-backed Iveco works team would return with reigning champion Gérard de Rooy, 2007 winner Hans Stacey and two-time World Rally champion Miki Biasion making up the driving strength.

Kamaz's trio of Red Bull sponsored trucks would be piloted by an all-Russian line-up of Eduard Nikolaev, Ayrat Mardeev and Andrey Karginov. Tatra's challenge would be headed by Czech driver Aleš Loprais, nephew of six-time champion Karel, while Dutchman Marcel van Vliet would lead the attack of German manufacturer MAN.

Stages
Distance according to the official website.

Notes:
 — The first part of the timed section of Stage 8, including the entire special stage for the trucks, was cancelled due to flooding.
 — The stage for the cars and trucks was shortened due to flash floods after the stage commenced.
 — Though Francisco López set the fastest stage time, Ruben Faria was awarded the stage win due to a 15-minute engine change for the Chilean rider.

Summary

Bikes
KTM rider Francisco López got his rally off to the best possible start by winning the opening stage, but Husqvarna's Joan Barreda took control of the overall standings by winning the second stage. The Spaniard however lost considerable time in the third stage with navigation problems, handing the lead to defending champion and works KTM rider Cyril Despres, who led by just under three minutes from stage winner López.

Despres however lost 17 minutes to stage winner Barreda during the fourth stage, handing the lead to Yamaha's Olivier Pain. The young French rider held the lead until the end of the seventh stage with some consistent stage times, but hit trouble during the eighth stage with a navigational error. This would mean Pain's teammate David Casteu, who won the fifth stage, headed into the rest day as leader of the overall standings.

More misfortune struck Yamaha however as Casteu struck a cow during the ninth stage, causing the Frenchman to dislocate his shoulder and retire from the rally. Despres was set to re-take the lead of the standings after winning the stage but dropped to second behind teammate Ruben Faria after taking a 15-minute penalty for an engine change. Despres nonetheless took the lead after finishing second during the tenth stage, with Faria losing 12 minutes to the leader during the eleventh stage.

Despite dropping eight minutes to Faria during the twelfth stage, Despres remained in control of the standings until the end of the rally, ending up with a winning margin of just under 11 minutes over Faria. López seemed set to threaten Despres after winning the penultimate stage and closing to within just over eight minutes of the Frenchman, an engine change penalty prior to the final stage cost him any chance of doing so. The Chilean would have to be content with third, nearly 19 minutes behind Despres despite taking the fastest time on the final stage, with Ivan Jakeš and Joan Pedrero completing an all-KTM top five.

Olivier Pain recovered to sixth position after his earlier troubles, whilst Barreda could do no better than 17th after losing considerable time with fuel pump issues on the fifth stage. Kurt Caselli had an impressive debut ride as a substitute for Marc Coma, winning two stages but finishing just outside the top 30 as a result of a navigational error during the eighth stage  and engine woes in the penultimate stage.

Quads
Yamaha's Marcos Patronelli took control of the overall standings by winning the stage ahead of Honda newcomer Sebastian Husseini. The two riders finished 1st and 2nd for the next two stages, Patronelli extending his advantage to 15 minutes after the fourth stage, before mechanical problems for Husseini during the fifth stage cost him several hours. This gave Patronelli a lead of almost an hour and 20 minutes over Ignacio Casale, also aboard a Yamaha, who closed the gap slightly with a win on the sixth stage.

Patronelli however began to extend his advantage once more over the following stages, with Casale dropping 23 minutes during the eleventh stage. With a cushion of one hour 50 minutes, Patronelli maintained his advantage over Casale until the end of the rally. Rafał Sonik completed a Yamaha 1–2–3, albeit over three hours adrift of Patronelli.

Łukasz Łaskawiec briefly held third position after finishing second during the fifth stage, but delays in the sixth and twelfth stages dropped him to a final finishing position of 13th. Sarel van Biljon also held third in the overall standings after winning the eighth stage, but major delays during the following stage left the South African finishing outside the top 20.

Cars
Qatar Red Bull driver Carlos Sainz was the winner of the first stage, and despite losing twenty minutes to X-Raid's Stéphane Peterhansel during the second stage, the two-time World Rally champion was declared the leader of the overall classification having lost time trying to pass a waypoint due to a fault with his GPS. However, this decision was later reversed, handing the stage win and the lead of the standings back to Peterhansel.

The Frenchman's closest challenger initially would prove Sainz's teammate Nasser Al-Attiyah, who closed to within five minutes of Peterhansel following wins in the third and fourth stages. Victory in the sixth stage brought the Qatari within one minute 20 seconds of the rally lead, but an engine problem during the ninth stage put an end to his challenge. With Sainz having retired after the sixth stage, also because of engine problems, it was an event to forget for the newly formed Qatar Red Bull team.

This meant that Peterhansel now had a lead of 49 minutes over Imperial Toyota's Giniel de Villiers, the South African able only to erase seven minutes of that advantage during the remaining stages. In this period, a battle for third emerged between X-Raid drivers Nani Roma and Leonid Novitskiy, with the latter holding the advantage until the former won the twelfth stage. Novitskiy however re-gained the advantage after Roma stopped during the penultimate stage to allow Peterhansel to run in convoy with him, so as to ensure overall victory for his teammate. Roma eventually finished fourth, eight minutes behind Novitskiy. Roma's hopes of challenging Peterhansel for victory were negated when the Spaniard lost over an hour during the sixth stage as a result of becoming stuck in a dune. Orlando Terranova made it four X-Raid drivers in the top five having won the tenth stage.

It was a difficult rally for Robby Gordon, who finished only fourteenth overall despite a late pair of stage victories. The American had a transmission problem in the opening stage and rolled his Hummer in the fourth stage, leaving him trying to make up for lost time for the remainder of the rally. X-Raid driver Krzysztof Hołowczyc was eliminated from the running after the third stage having sustained back and rib injuries in a crash.

Trucks
Defending champion Gérard de Rooy took control of the event initially with victories in the first three stages for Iveco, building a seven-minute cushion over Tatra's Aleš Loprais. The Czech driver then took the lead of the overall standings after the fourth stage as de Rooy hit delays, but lost his advantage after becoming stuck in the sand during the following stage. This handed the lead of the rally back to de Rooy, who led by just over five minutes from Kamaz driver Eduard Nikolaev after the fifth stage.

The Dutchman extended this advantage to 22 minutes with back-to-back victories in the sixth and seventh stages, but disaster struck during the ninth stage – turbo failure, steering problems and a puncture conspired to drop de Rooy by nearly an hour. This gave Nikolaev the lead of the rally with 18 minutes in hand from Tatra's Martin Kolomy, though the Kamaz of Ayrat Mardeev would take second position after the eleventh stage and Andrey Karginov would move ahead of Kolomy into third position after victory in the twelfth stage.

Another victory in the penultimate stage allowed Karginov to move ahead of Mardeev, albeit some 36 minutes behind eventual victor Nikolaev. Karginov however lost out on the runner-up position during the final stage, with Mardeev doing just enough to clinch second by a margin of under a minute. Behind the all-Kamaz podium, de Rooy recovered to fourth position overall after winning the eleventh stage, 41 minutes behind Nikolaev, with Kolomy fifth and Loprais in sixth after his earlier troubles.

Miki Biasion ran third early on for Iveco, but was ruled out of contention after hitting severe delays during the fourth stage, going on to finish 13th overall. Former winner Hans Stacey meanwhile was forced to retire from the event after rolling his Iveco during the sixth stage.

Stage results
Results according to the official website.

Bikes

Notes:
 — Includes a 15-minute penalty for an engine change; this does not affect Despres' status as winner of Stage 9.

Quads

Notes:
 — González's time includes a five-minute penalty.

Cars

Notes:
 — Carlos Sainz and Timo Gottschalk were initially retroactively recognised as the winners of the second stage after a problem with Global Positioning System satellites used by rally organisers meant that the timing system did not register their passing a waypoint on the stage, and they lost twenty minutes trying to pass the marker. After further investigation however, the race officials decided to reverse this decision, handing the stage win back to Stéphane Peterhansel and Jean-Paul Cottret.
 — A swollen riverbed during Stage 8 meant that only five cars were able to reach the end of the stage. As a result, all competitors who failed to make the finish were awarded the same time as Stéphane Peterhansel and Jean-Paul Cottret, meaning the gaps between the leaders in the overall classification did not change.

Trucks

Final standings

Bikes

Quads

Cars

Trucks

Fatalities

It was reported that, on the evening of 9 January, two people died as a result of a collision between a taxi and the support vehicle for the 'Race2Recovery' team, which is made up of ex-military servicemen from the UK. The team members travelling in the support vehicle were taken to hospital along with the four surviving passengers of the taxi.

On 11 January, a competitor in the motorcycle category, Frenchman Thomas Bourgin, was killed in a road accident with a Chilean police car whilst travelling to the start of the day's stage. He was running 68th overall at the time of the incident.

References

External links
 

Dakar Rally
Dakar Rally
Dakar
Dakar Rally